The Scottdale Scotties were a minor league baseball team located in Scottdale, Pennsylvania from 1925 until 1931. The club was a member of the class C Middle Atlantic League. The team was primarily named the Scotties; however, the club was renamed the Scottdale Cardinals in 1931. The team was affiliated with the St. Louis Cardinals from 1929 until 1931.

The team was managed by future St. Louis manager Eddie Dyer in 1929 and 1930. Also in 1930 future Hall of Famer Joe Medwick, played as an outfielder for the Scotties.

Notable alumni

Dick Attreau
Dick Barrett
Bill Beckmann
Bill Bishop
Ed Boland
Jim Bucher
Ed Chapman
Ed Clough
Bill Crouch
George Durning
Eddie Dyer
Clarence Heise
Bill Lee
Joe Malay
Joe Medwick
Jo-Jo Morrissey
Heinie Mueller
Johnny Murphy
Red Nonnenkamp
Mike Ryba
Dutch Schesler
Paul Schreiber
Bill Trotter
Johnnie Tyler
Bud Weiser
Jim Winford

Year-by-year record

References

Baseball Reference Scottdale, Pennsylvania
Eddie Dyer: A Man for All Seasons

Baseball teams established in 1925
Baseball teams disestablished in 1931
Defunct minor league baseball teams
St. Louis Cardinals minor league affiliates
1925 establishments in Pennsylvania
1931 disestablishments in Pennsylvania
Westmoreland County, Pennsylvania
Defunct baseball teams in Pennsylvania
Middle Atlantic League teams